Hassan Badra (born 19 May 1958) is an Egyptian athlete. He competed in the men's triple jump at the 1984 Summer Olympics.

References

1958 births
Living people
Athletes (track and field) at the 1984 Summer Olympics
Egyptian male triple jumpers
Olympic athletes of Egypt
Place of birth missing (living people)